José Luis Madrid (11 April 1933 – 19 July 1999) was a Spanish screenwriter, producer and film director.

Selected filmography
 Ruthless Colt of the Gringo (1966)
 Somebody's Stolen Our Russian Spy (1967)
 Seven Murders for Scotland Yard (1971) aka Jack the Ripper of London
 The Crimes of Petiot (1973) starred Paul Naschy
 Last Tango in Madrid (1975)
 English Striptease (1975)
 Muerte de un Presidente (Death of a President) (1977) starred Paul Naschy
 Invierno en Marbella (1983)

References

Bibliography
 Goble, Alan. The Complete Index to Literary Sources in Film. Walter de Gruyter, 1999.

External links

1933 births
1999 deaths
Spanish film producers
Spanish film directors
People from Madrid
20th-century Spanish screenwriters
20th-century Spanish male writers